Jules François Alexandre Joffrin (16 March 1846 – 17 September 1890) was a French politician.

Joffrin was born at Troyes. He served in the Franco-German War, was involved in the Commune, and spent eleven years in England as a political exile. He attached himself to the possibilist group of the socialist party, the section opposed to the root-and-branch measures of Jules Guesde. He became a member of the municipal council of Paris in 1885, and vice-president in 1888–1889.

Violently attacked by the Boulangist organs, L'Intransigeant and La France, he won a suit against them for libel, and in 1889 he contested the 18th arrondissement of Paris with General Boulanger, who obtained a majority of over 2000 votes, but was declared ineligible.

Joffrin was only admitted to the Chamber after a heated discussion, and continued to be attacked by the nationalists. He died in Paris on 17 September 1890.

A Paris Métro station, Jules Joffrin, is named in his honour. The station is located in Montmartre, near the town hall of the 18th arrondissement.

References

French socialists
1846 births
1890 deaths
Burials at Père Lachaise Cemetery